Ersilia Cavedagni (April 2, 1862after 1941) was an Italian-American anarcha-feminist activist, writer, and editor.

Biography 
Cavedagni was born in Northern Italy to Francesco and Enrica Amadei. At a young age she married the Bolognese anarchist Giulio Grandi, with whom she had a daughter, Edvige. The Grandi home became a gathering place for anarchists and provided shelter to militants such as P. Gori and Vivaldo Lacchini.

Cavedagni (then known as Ersilia Grandi) was one of the few women in the region to play a significant role in the movement. She is said to have had a remarkable and lively intelligence as well as "belle fattezze" (beautiful features). She wrote propaganda and gave speeches to crowds of proletarian women. From September 1894 to April 1895 she was imprisoned in Bassano Veneto for her political activities.

Sometime in the 1890s, she met and fell in love with Giuseppe Ciancabilla, a fellow anarchist and a friend of Errico Malatesta. The pair fled Italy together during the police crackdown on workers' movements. They spent two years traveling in Switzerland, Belgium, and France, during which Cavedagni published several essays and letters in  La Questione Sociale (The Social Question). In one letter, she criticized women anarchists in the United States for failing to address the "woman question," writing, "If we were to have many anarchist women, oh, believe me, the movement would grow substantially....who does not remember the teachings of our mothers?"

In 1898, Cavedagni and Ciancabilla moved to Paterson, New Jersey, where Ciancabilla became editor of La Questione Sociale and later, editor of another anarchist newspaper, L'Aurora. During her stay in the area she befriended and influenced the young anarchist Ernestina Cravello and joined the Teatro Sociale, a theater group that staged plays about women's emancipation. She published essays in L'Aurora and Cronaca Sovversiva, and edited several issues of L'Aurora after Ciancabilla was arrested for praising Leon Czolgosz (the man who assassinated President McKinley in 1901).

The couple moved to Chicago, then San Francisco, where they were closely monitored by the Italian authorities. Cavedagni was considered a "very dangerous anarchist," of "limited formal instruction but much audaciousness." Ciancabilla suddenly fell ill and died in 1904 at the age of 32.

What little is known of Cavedagni's later life is based on her correspondence and subscriptions to anarchist newspapers. She moved frequently, living at various times in Philadelphia, New York, Vancouver, and San Francisco. In 1912 she was living in Seattle with the French Anarchist Leon Morel. According to an Italian police report, she was still living "abroad" in 1941.

Partial list of writings

References

Bibliography 
 
 
 
 

1862 births
Year of death unknown
Date of death unknown
Italian anarchists
American anarchists
Italian feminists
Italian emigrants to the United States
Politicians from Bologna
People from Paterson, New Jersey
19th-century Italian writers
19th-century Italian women writers
Anarcha-feminists
American socialist feminists
Italian women editors
American women editors
Italian socialist feminists